Lake Solitude is a highland tarn located in western New Hampshire, United States, at the top of Sunapee Ridge between the main summit of Mount Sunapee and South Peak. A popular hiking destination, Lake Solitude is accessible via the Andrew Brook Trail, the Newbury Trail, or the long-distance Monadnock-Sunapee Greenway Trail. White Ledge, elevation , rises steeply above the lake's west shore and provides expansive views. The lake is considered an important habitat for rare species and is off limits to swimmers and dogs.

Lake Solitude drains into Andrew Brook, thence into Todd Lake, the Warner River, the Contoocook River, then into the Merrimack River and the Atlantic Ocean.

The lake is classified as a coldwater fishery, with observed species including brook trout.

See also

List of lakes in New Hampshire

References

Monadnock-Sunapee Greenway Trail Guide, fifth edition (1994). Concord, New Hampshire: Society for the Protection of New Hampshire Forests.
Delorme Topo 6.0 (2006). Mapping software. Yarmouth, Maine: DeLorme.

Lakes of Merrimack County, New Hampshire
Lakes of New Hampshire